Rosa Merino may refer to:
 Rosa Merino (footballer)
 Rosa Merino (singer)